Josef Havela is a former Czechoslovak slalom canoeist who competed in the 1970s. He won a silver medal in the C-2 team event at the 1973 ICF Canoe Slalom World Championships in Muotathal.

References

External links 
 Josef HAVELA at CanoeSlalom.net

Czechoslovak male canoeists
Living people
Year of birth missing (living people)
Medalists at the ICF Canoe Slalom World Championships